George Owens may refer to:

George Welshman Owens (1786–1856), United States Representative and lawyer from Georgia
George Owens (footballer) (1900–1986), Australian rules footballer from Western Australia
George Owens (mayor) (1808–1897), Lord Mayor of Dublin, 1876
George Owens (rugby), rugby union and rugby league footballer of the 1910s and 1920s for Swansea (RU), Wales (RL), and Wigan
George A. Owens (1861–1936), politician from New York
George Albert Owens (1919–2003), American educator

See also
George Owen (disambiguation)